Carcinopyga proserpina is a moth of the family Erebidae. It was described by Otto Staudinger in 1887. It is found in Uzbekistan, Tajikistan, Kyrgyzstan, Kazakhstan and eastern Afghanistan.

Subspecies
Carcinopyga proserpina proserpina (Uzbekistan, Tadzhikistan)
Carcinopyga proserpina lindti Cerny, 1986 (Uzbekistan, Kyrgyzstan, Kazakhstan)

References

Callimorphina
Moths described in 1887